TalkTV is a British television channel owned and operated by News UK. It launched on 25 April 2022.

The channel features video simulcasts of TalkRadio programming in off-peak hours, but launched with three original programmes, The News Desk, Piers Morgan Uncensored, and The Talk.

History

Background

Australian-born American media magnate Rupert Murdoch originally entered the British television news market in 1989 with the launch of Sky News. In 1996, Murdoch entered the US and Australian television news markets with Fox News and Sky News Australia. In the 2010s, the Murdoch family began to sell a number of assets, including 21st Century Fox and Sky Plc, the companies that owned those news channels at the time.

In January 2018, the Competition and Markets Authority issued a preliminary report recommending that Sky News be insulated from the remainder of Murdoch's assets, or divested, in order to preserve its editorial independence. Murdoch retained control of Fox News and Sky News Australia, but Sky News UK was sold to Comcast, leaving Murdoch without a television news presence in the United Kingdom.

Initial foundation as News UK TV 
In December 2020, Ofcom granted a licence to News UK, to operate a new linear television channel under the name News UK TV. By April 2021, it was thought that News UK TV would become a streaming-only service which would operate for a few hours a night. Rebekah Brooks said to News UK staff that "it was not commercially viable to launch a traditional news channel on linear TV".

David Rhodes, formerly of CBS News and Fox News, joined News UK with the aim of a launching their streaming video news service in 2020. In an interview with the BBC Radio 4's The Media Show, Andrew Neil claimed that he was approached to join News UK's television output by Rhodes before he joined rival GB News. In April 2021 it was announced that Rhodes was to leave News UK in June. Scott Taunton replaced Rhodes as News UK's CEO of broadcasting.

Pivot to TalkTV 
By September 2021, plans for a service called News UK TV had been scrapped and talkRadio instead launched a video feed on smart/internet-connected TVs, with Mike Graham, Trisha Goddard, Julia Hartley-Brewer, Jeremy Kyle and Robert Rinder featuring as presenters on the service. The preceding months had seen its right-wing rival, GB News, launch as a linear television channel. The 'Talk' brand and family of radio stations had previously been acquired by News UK in September 2016 as part of their purchase of Wireless Group.

Later in September 2021, it was revealed that the "Talk" brand would be used for a linear television station launching in 2022. This change of approach reportedly claimed after Murdoch was bemused by the channels on offer during the pandemic. It was also announced that Piers Morgan would host a show on the channel.

After gaining a comparatively large viewership on opening night, viewers declined over the following days.

Broadcast 
The channel broadcasts from studios within The News Building in Central London. The linear channel was launched on Freesat and Freeview, as well as on Sky and Virgin Media on 25 April 2022. It is also available on-demand.

When announcing Piers Morgan's programme, it was stated that it would also be carried by two other Murdoch-owned outlets: Fox Nation (a streaming service in the U.S. run as a companion to Fox News) and Sky News Australia. Some TalkTV programming is also simulcast on select local television channels around the UK. Local TV's chairman, David Montgomery, is a former executive at Murdoch's News UK.

Since launch ratings have been very low with some shows, especially those broadcast in the evening, recording few viewers, if any. The channel has the lowest viewership compared to similar news and opinion-based news shows.

With the appointment of Conservative MP Nadine Dorries as a presenter, Dorries was deemed to have breached the Government’s anti-corruption rules by not advising ACOBA about her role with the channel.

Notable presenters

Former presenters
 Darryl Morris (Still Appears on Jeremy Kyle Live)

References

External links 
 

2022 establishments in the United Kingdom
Television channels and stations established in 2022
24-hour television news channels in the United Kingdom
News UK
English-language television stations in the United Kingdom
Mass media companies based in London
Television news in the United Kingdom